Lockhart v. United States may refer to:
 Lockhart v. United States (2016), 577 U.S. ___, a case on the interpretation of a qualifier phrase in a federal statute
 Lockhart v. United States (2005), 546 U.S. 142, a case on whether the government can withhold Social Security benefits to collect student loan debt
 City of Lockhart v. United States, 460 U.S. 125, a 1983 case on whether election law changes violated the Voting Rights Act